Mniaceae is a moss family in the order Bryales.

Taxonomy

The family Mniaceae includes the following genera:

 Cinclidium 
 Cyrtomnium 
 Epipterygium  
 Leucolepis 
 Mielichhoferia 
 Mnium 
 Orthomnion 
 Plagiomnium 
 Pohlia 
 Pseudobryum 
 Pseudopohlia 
 Rhizomnium 
 Schizymenium 
 Synthetodontium 
 Trachycystis

References

 
Moss families